Niko Karel Koffeman (born 12 May 1958) is a Dutch politician and animal rights activist. A Party for the Animals member, he holds a seat and is his party's leader in the Senate since 12 June 2007.

Career
Born in Maassluis, Koffeman worked for several years as a campaign strategist for the Socialist Party. Among his accomplishments was the creation of their current logo. In addition to his political work, he has been active in several animal rights organizations. He has also worked as a broadcast director. He later played a key role in the creation of the Party for Animals. He is a eurosceptic.

Personal
Koffeman is married to television presenter Antoinette Hertsenberg. They are members of the Seventh-day Adventist Church. He is a vegetarian.

See also
 List of animal rights advocates

References
  Parlement.com biography

External links
Niko Koffeman biography at Party for Animals website 

1958 births
Living people
21st-century Dutch politicians
Christian vegetarianism
Dutch political party founders
Dutch Seventh-day Adventists
Members of the Senate (Netherlands)
Party for the Animals politicians
People from Maassluis